Monazite-(Nd) is a relatively rare representative of the monazite group, with neodymium being the dominant rare earth element in its structure. This variety of monazite is typically colored bright rose-red. It is the neodymium analogue of monazite-(Ce), monazite-(La), and monazite-(Sm). The group contains simple rare earth phosphate minerals with the general formula of ATO4, where A = Ce, La, Nd, or Sm (or, rarely, Bi), and B = P or, rarely, As. The A site may also bear Ca and Th.

References

Neodymium compounds
Phosphate minerals
Monoclinic minerals
Minerals in space group 14